This is a list of animal species introduced to the Hawaiian Islands, and that are currently still established.

Amphibians

Arthropods

Birds

Mammals

Reptiles

See also
 List of introduced species

References

 
 
Introduced